How to Fish is an animated short produced by Walt Disney Productions and first released on December 9, 1942. It stars Goofy and was directed by Jack Kinney.

Plot
Like all "How To" Disney shorts, this one opens with a narrator explaining how to fish, with Goofy acting as the visual narrator. This short film does not have a plot; all the facts are jumbled together, with several humorous facts and clips.

Voice cast
 Goofy: George Johnson
 Narrator: John McLeish

Home media
The short was released on December 2, 2002, on Walt Disney Treasures: The Complete Goofy.

Additional releases include:
Walt Disney's Classic Cartoon Favorites Starring Goofy Volume 3

References

External links
 

1942 short films
1942 animated films
Films about fishing
Goofy (Disney) short films
1940s Disney animated short films
Films directed by Jack Kinney
Films produced by Walt Disney
1940s English-language films
American animated short films
RKO Pictures short films
RKO Pictures animated short films
Animated films about dogs
Animated films about fish